William of Shoreham (fourteenth century) was an English poet.

Little is known of his life, but he probably lived in Shoreham, Kent and was  vicar of Chart (near Leeds, Kent). Seven poems in English are attributed to him, all contained in a single manuscript now in the British Library (Add MS 17376). Four of the poems are didactic and address points of Christian doctrine, the other three are in praise of the Virgin Mary (one of them a translation from Robert Grosseteste's Latin). He was once thought to be the author of an English psalter, but this is now considered spurious.

Further reading
M. Konrath, The Poems of William of Shoreham (Early English Text Society, 1902) - available online

People from Shoreham, Kent
14th-century English poets
14th-century English people
English male poets